Thionyl tetrafluoride is an inorganic compound gas with the formula SOF4.  It is also known as sulfur tetrafluoride oxide.  The shape of the molecule is a distorted trigonal bipyramid, with the oxygen found on the equator.  The atoms on the equator have shorter bond lengths than the fluorine atoms on the axis.  The sulfur oxygen bond is 1.409Å. A S−F bond on the axis has length 1.596Å and the S−F bond on the equator has length 1.539Å.  The angle between the equatorial fluorine atoms is 112.8°.  The angle between axial fluorine and oxygen is 97.7°. The angle between oxygen and equatorial fluorine is 123.6° and between axial and equatorial fluorine is 85.7°.  The fluorine atoms only produce one NMR line, probably because they exchange positions.

Formation
Thionyl fluoride reacting with fluorine gas can produce thionyl tetrafluoride.  This was how the gas was first discovered by Moissan and Lebeau in 1902.  They identified the formula by the pressure changes resulting from the reaction.  Silver fluoride and platinum are capable of catalyzing the reaction.

It can also be formed by heating sulfur hexafluoride with air to 400°.  This can happen when inhaling through a lit cigarette.  Or the reaction of silver difluoride with thionyl fluoride at 200 degrees.  Another way to form it is by electrolyzing hydrogen fluoride with a solution of sulfur dioxide, which also made oxygen difluoride and sulfuryl fluoride.  Also thionyl chloride or thionyl fluoride electrolyzed with hydrogen fluoride produced even more of the gas.

Reactions
Thionyl tetrafluoride reacts with water to make hydrofluoric acid, sulfurofluoridic acid, and sulfuryl difluoride.  Mercury can strip off fluoride to make thionyl fluoride and mercurous fluoride.  Strong bases result in formation of fluoride and fluorosulfate ions.

Click chemistry 
Thionyl tetrafluoride can be used in click chemistry through reactions with primary amines known as sulfur(VI) fluoride exchange (SuFEx). This kind of reaction was the first "click" reaction to generate a three-dimensional core.

References

http://www.freepatentsonline.com/2946661.html

Thionyl compounds
Oxyfluorides
Sulfur(VI) compounds
Sulfur oxohalides